Hudson Township is one of twenty-four townships in Bates County, Missouri, and is part of the Kansas City metropolitan area within the USA.  As of the 2000 census, its population was 229. As of the 2010 census, the town's population was 252. Its population was estimated to be 226 in 2018.

History
Hudson was named for the explorer Henry Hudson.

Geography
According to the United States Census Bureau, Hudson Township covers an area of 45.99 square miles (119.11 square kilometers); of this, 45.92 square miles (118.93 square kilometers, 99.85 percent) is land and 0.07 square miles (0.18 square kilometers, 0.15 percent) is water.

Unincorporated towns
 Hudson at 
(This list is based on USGS data and may include former settlements.)

Adjacent townships
 Deepwater Township (north)
 Deepwater Township, Henry County (northeast)
 Appleton Township, St. Clair County (east)
 Taber Township, St. Clair County (southeast)
 Rockville Township (south)
 Prairie Township (southwest)
 Pleasant Gap Township (west)

Cemeteries
The township contains these four cemeteries: Blackwell, Meyer, Myers and Round Prairie.

Major highways
  Missouri Route 52

Lakes
 Appleton City Lake

School districts
 Rich Hill R-IV

Political districts
 Missouri's 4th congressional district
 State House District 120
 State Senate District 31

References
 United States Census Bureau 2008 TIGER/Line Shapefiles
 United States Board on Geographic Names (GNIS)
 United States National Atlas

External links
 US-Counties.com

Townships in Bates County, Missouri
Townships in Missouri